Thymocyte expressed, positive selection associated 1 is a protein that in humans is encoded by the TESPA1 gene.

References

Further reading 

 
 

Genes
Human proteins